Empress Wenxianzhaosheng (died before 1329) was the posthumous name of the mother of Jayaatu Khan (Emperor Wenzong), emperor of the Yuan dynasty of China. She was an ethnic Tangut and a concubine of Külüg Khan. She gave birth to the future Jayaatu Khan in 1304.

Her given name is unknown. Her posthumous title was given by her son in 1329.

References

14th-century Tangut women
Yuan dynasty posthumous empresses
13th-century Tangut women